The palaces in Venice are the following:
Ca' da Mosto
Ca' d'Oro
Ca' Farsetti
Ca' Loredan
Ca' Pesaro
Ca' Rezzonico
Ca' Vendramin Calergi
Ca' Zen
Palazzo Adoldo
Palazzo Ariani
Palazzo Barbarigo
Palazzo Barbarigo Nani Mocenigo
Palazzi Barbaro
Palazzo Barbaro Wolkoff
Palazzo Bonfadini Vivante
Palazzo Bollani Erizzo
Palazzo D'Anna Viaro Martinengo Volpi di Misurata
Palazzo Calbo Crotta
Palazzo Cavalli
Palazzo Cavalli-Franchetti
Palazzo Contarini del Bovolo
Palazzo Contarini Dal Zaffo
Palazzo Contarini Fasan 
Palazzo Contarini Pisani
Palazzo Contarini Flangini 
Palazzo Cornaro
Palazzo Corner della Ca' Grande
Palazzo Corner Spinelli
Palazzo Corner Valmarana
Palazzo Correr Contarini Zorzi
Palazzo Corner Contarini dei Cavalli
Palazzo Dandolo
Palazzo Dario
Palazzo Ducale
Palazzo Erizzo Nani Mocenigo
Palazzo Farsetti
Palazzo Ferro Fini
Palazzo Foscari
Palazzo Giovanelli
Palazzo Gradenigo
Palazzo Grassi
Palazzo Grimani di San Luca
Palazzo Grimani di Santa Maria Formosa
Palazzo Labia
Palazzo Malipiero
Palazzo Marcello Toderini
Palazzo Mastelli del Cammello
Palazzo Michiel del Brusà
Palazzo Memmo Martinengo Mandelli
Palazzo Mocenigo Gambara
Palazzo Molina
Palazzo Moro Lin (San Marco)
Palazzo Moro Lin (San Polo)
Palazzo Nani
Palazzo Orio Semitecolo Benzon
Palazzo Pisani a San Stefano
Palazzo Pisani Gritti
Palazzo Pisani Moretta
Palazzo Querini Benzon
Palazzo Regio
Palazzo Savorgnan
Palazzo Smith Mangilli Valmarana
Palazzo Soranzo Cappello
Palazzo Soranzo Van Axel
Palazzo Surian Bellotto
Palazzo Testa
Palazzo Tiepolo
Palazzo Pisani Moretta
Palazzo Zorzi Bon

External link

 
Palaces
Venice
Palaces in Venice
Palaces, Venice